The 2009 Veikkausliiga was the 79th season of top-tier football in Finland. It began on 18 April 2009 and ended on 17 October 2009. Inter Turku were the defending champions.

The championship was won by HJK Helsinki, who came out on top of a three-team race which also involved Honka Espoo and TPS Turku. On the bottom end of the table, RoPS were relegated to the Ykkönen while JJK will have to compete in a two-legged relegation play-off.

Promotion and relegation
KooTeePee finished at the bottom of the 2008 season and were relegated to Ykkönen. Their place was taken by Ykkönen champions JJK. 13th placed Veikkausliiga team KuPS and Ykkönen runners-up competed in a two-legged relegation play-offs for one spot in 2009 Veikkausliiga. KuPS won 2–1 on aggregate and thereby retained their league position.

Overview

Managerial changes

League table

Relegation play-offs
JJK as 13th placed team of 2009 Veikkausliiga and KPV as runners-up of the 2009 Ykkönen competed in a two-legged play-offs for one spot in the 2010 Veikkausliiga. JJK won the play-offs by 5–3 and remained in Veikkausliiga.

Results

Statistics

Top goalscorers
Source: veikkausliiga.com

Top assistants
Source: veikkausliiga.com

Monthly awards

References

External links
 Official site 
 uefa.com

Veikkausliiga seasons
Fin
Fin
1